Curtis McDowald (born 23 January 1996) is an American épée fencer. He competed in the 2020 Summer Olympics.

References

External links
 St. John's Red Storm bio

1996 births
Living people
Sportspeople from New York City
Fencers at the 2020 Summer Olympics
American male épée fencers
Olympic fencers of the United States
St. John's Red Storm fencers